The Fuji apple is an apple cultivar developed by growers at Tohoku Research Station (農林省園芸試験場東北支場) in Fujisaki, Aomori, Japan, in the late 1930s, and brought to market in 1962. It originated as a cross between two American apple varieties—the Red Delicious and old Virginia Ralls Janet (sometimes cited as "Rawls Jennet") apples. According to the US Apple Association website it is one of the nine most popular apple cultivars in the United States. Its name is derived from the first part of the town where it was developed: Fujisaki.

Overview 
Fuji apples are typically round and range from large to very large, averaging  in diameter. They contain between 9–11% sugars by weight and have a dense flesh that is sweeter and crisper than many other apple cultivars, making them popular with consumers around the world.  Fuji apples also have a very long shelf life compared to other apples, even without refrigeration.  With refrigeration, Fuji apples can remain fresh for up to a year.

In Japan, Fuji apples continue to be an unrivaled best-seller. Japanese consumers prefer the crispy texture and sweetness of Fuji apples (which is somewhat reminiscent of the coveted Nashi pear) almost to the exclusion of other varieties and Japan's apple imports remain low.  Aomori Prefecture, home to the Fuji apple, is the best known apple growing region of Japan.  Of the roughly 900,000 tons of Japanese apples produced annually, 500,000 tons come from Aomori.

Outside Japan, the popularity of Fuji apples continues to grow. In 2016 and 2017, Fuji apples accounted for nearly 70% of China's 43 million tons grown.  Since their introduction into the US market in the 1980s, Fuji apples have gained popularity with American consumers — as of 2016, Fuji apples ranked number 3 on the US Apple Association's list of most popular apples, only trailing Red Delicious and Gala. Fuji apples are grown in traditional apple-growing states such as Washington, Michigan, Pennsylvania, New York, and California. Washington State, where more than half of America's apple crop is grown, produces about 135,000 tons of Fuji apples each year, third in volume behind Red Delicious and Gala varieties.

Fuji apples have recently been projected by the US Apple Association to be in 4th place as America's favorite apple.

In the United States and Canada, the Price look-up code (PLU code) for Fuji apples is 4131.

Gallery

Mutant cultivars
Many sports (mutant cultivars) of the Fuji apple have been recognized and propagated. In addition to those that have remained unpatented, twenty had received US plant patents by August 2008:

Unpatented Fuji mutants include:
 BC 2
 Desert Rose Fuji
 Nagafu 2
 Nagafu 6
 Nagafu 12
 Redsport Type 1
 Redsport Type 2

See also 
 Grapple (fruit) — a Concord grape-flavor-infused Fuji apple

References

External links 

 https://web.archive.org/web/20041209122435/http://www.fas.usda.gov/htp2/circular/2000/00-11/applesit.htm
 https://web.archive.org/web/20070928174409/http://www.idfta.org/cft/1998/vol31no1/barritt/Barritt_Fuji.pdf
 http://www.bbg.org/gar2/topics/kitchen/handbooks/apples/northamerica.html
 Patents covering Fuji Apples
 The International Federation for Produce Coding (IFPC) 
 Popular apple variety harbors unusual cell growth EurekAlert March 25, 2008

Japanese apples
Apple cultivars with patented mutants
Apple cultivars